Jackson Township is one of nine townships in Sullivan County, Indiana, United States. As of the 2010 census, its population was 1,904 and it contained 843 housing units.

Geography

Cities and towns
 Hymera

Unincorporated communities
 Lewis

Adjacent townships
 Pierson Township, Vigo County (north)
 Lewis Township, Clay County (east)
 Wright Township, Greene County (southeast)
 Cass Township (south)
 Hamilton Township (southwest)
 Curry Township (west)
 Linton Township, Vigo County (northwest)

Cemeteries
The township contains these two cemeteries: Knights of Columbus and Mount Pleasant.

Lakes
 Hickory Lake

Landmarks
 Shakamak State Park

School districts
 Northeast School Corporation

Political districts
 Indiana's 8th congressional district
 State House District 45
 State Senate District 39

References
 United States Census Bureau 2008 TIGER/Line Shapefiles
 United States Board on Geographic Names (GNIS)
 IndianaMap

External links
 Indiana Township Association
 United Township Association of Indiana

Townships in Sullivan County, Indiana
Terre Haute metropolitan area
Townships in Indiana